Xavier "Xavi" Boniquet Rodríguez (born 29 May 1990) is a Spanish footballer who plays for CE Sabadell FC as a left winger.

Club career
Born in Barcelona, Catalonia, Boniquet finished his formation with Terrassa FC. In July 2009, he moved to CA Osasuna and was assigned to the reserves in Segunda División B, and made his senior debut on 19 September of that year, playing the last 29 minutes in a 1–0 away win against Sestao River Club.

In July 2010, after appearing rarely, Boniquet moved to CF Pobla de Mafumet in Tercera División. On 16 January 2013, he agreed to a contract with UE Sant Andreu in the third division.

On 15 August 2015, after representing third tier sides CF Badalona and UE Cornellà, Boniquet returned to Terrassa, being assigned to the main squad in the fourth division. On 29 July of the following year, after scoring a career-best nine goals, he moved to CF Peralada, helping the side in their promotion to division three.

Boniquet returned to Badalona on 28 July 2018, but moved to fellow third division side CE Sabadell FC on 17 August of the following year. With the latter side he achieved promotion to Segunda División in his first season, and renewed his contract for a further year on 9 July 2020.

Boniquet made his professional debut at the age of 30 on 27 September 2020, coming on as a second-half substitute for Iker Undabarrena in a 0–1 away loss against RCD Mallorca.

References

External links

1990 births
Living people
Footballers from Terrassa
Spanish footballers
Association football wingers
Segunda División players
Segunda División B players
Tercera División players
CA Osasuna B players
CF Pobla de Mafumet footballers
UE Sant Andreu footballers
CF Badalona players
UE Cornellà players
Terrassa FC footballers
CF Peralada players
CE Sabadell FC footballers